The Russian Reconciliation Center for Syria, officially known as the Centre for Reconciliation of Opposing Sides and Refugee Migration Monitoring in the Syrian Arab Republic, founded 23 February 2016, states that it is a "peace monitoring center and information office" whose stated aim is to speed the peace negotiations between the Syrian Arab Republic and opposition groups. It is a joint Turkish-Russian government enterprise founded in agreement with the US-led coalition and is headquartered in Khmeimim Air Base, Latakia, Syria. It is also reportedly tasked with coordinating humanitarian missions and organizing localities to sign up to ceasefire agreements.

In May 2017, the reconciliation center was able to deliver 4.7 tonnes of humanitarian aid in 10 missions within 24 hours, according to the Russian Ministry of Defense.

The Russian Reconciliation Center has also made allegations about what they called "video brigades" carrying out staged filming of made-up scenes after airstrikes, shelling and incidents involving chemical weapons. It has also alleged that "consultants" for the "brigades" were known to locals as Al Jazeera cameramen. Al Jazeera has denied similar claims.

References

External links
 Bulletins of the Centre for Reconciliation of Opposing Sides and Refugee Migration Monitoring in the Syrian Arab Republic

2016 establishments in Russia
2016 establishments in Syria
Military units and formations established in 2016
Organizations of the Syrian civil war
Russian involvement in the Syrian civil war
Ministry of Defence (Russia)